The Campeonato de España–Copa de Su Majestad el Rey, commonly known as Copa del Rey or simply La Copa and formerly known as Copa del Presidente de la República (1932–36) and Copa del Generalísimo (1939–76), is an annual knockout football competition in Spanish football, organized by the Royal Spanish Football Federation.

The competition was founded in 1903, thus making it the oldest Spanish football competition played at a national level. It is considered one of the most prestigious national cup trophies in the world. Copa del Rey winners qualify for the  following season's UEFA Europa League. If they have already qualified for Europe through their league position, then the Europa League spot is given to the highest-placed team in the league who has not yet qualified (until 2014 this place was awarded to the Copa runners-up, unless they too had already qualified via the league).

Barcelona is the most successful club in the competition, having won 31 Spanish Cup titles. Athletic Club have the second-most titles, with 23, while Real Madrid is third, with 19. Real Betis is the most recent winner, having defeated Valencia in the 2022 final held at the Estadio de La Cartuja.

History

In 1902, a competition under the name Copa de la Coronación was played after Juan de Astorquia, President of Bilbao Football Club, and Carlos Padrós, later president of Real Madrid, suggested a football tournament to celebrate the coronation of Spanish King Alfonso XIII. Four other teams joined Madrid FC for the competition: FC Barcelona, Club Español de Foot-Ball, New Foot-Ball de Madrid and Club Bizcaya (a team made up of players from Athletic Club and Bilbao FC), which eventually defeated Barcelona in the final. That cup is on display in the Athletic Bilbao museum and the club includes the victory in its honours list. Nevertheless, it is considered only the forerunner of the Copa del Rey.  The Royal Spanish Football Federation officially does not recognize it.

The Copa del Rey was Spain's football national championship from 1903 (the first edition won by Athletic Bilbao with Juan de Astorquia as captain and president) until the foundation of the Campeonato de Liga—League Championship—in 1928. It was initially known as the Copa del Ayuntamiento de Madrid (Madrid City Council's Cup). Between 1905 and 1932, it was known as the Copa de Su Majestad El Rey Alfonso XIII (His Majesty King Alfonso XIII's Cup). During the Second Spanish Republic, it was known as the Copa del Presidente de la República (President of the Republic Cup) or Copa de España (Spanish Cup) and during the years of Francisco Franco's Spanish State, it was known as the Copa de Su Excelencia El Generalísimo or Copa del Generalísimo (His Excellency, The Supreme General's Cup).

Athletic Bilbao were declared winners in 1904 after their opponents Español de Madrid failed to show up. In both 1910 and 1913, there was a split among the clubs and two rival associations, the Unión Española de Clubs de Fútbol and the Federación Española de Fútbol, organised rival competitions, the Copa UECF and the Copa FEF. In 1937, during the Spanish Civil War, clubs in the Republican area of Spain entered the Copa de la España Libre, with Levante beating their city rivals Valencia 1–0 in the final. Although in 2007 the Congress of Deputies urged the Royal Spanish Football Federation to recognise it as a Copa del Rey win for Levante, the governing body of Spanish football has not made a decision yet (as of 2008).

Because of the dispute regarding the 1902 competition, the statistics regarding the leading winners are also disputed. Barcelona have won the Copa 31 times; Athletic Bilbao are in second place, with either 23 or 24 titles, depending on the source.

Before the formation of La Liga in 1929, the competition was effectively a national championship. Teams qualified to enter via their regional leagues. Over the years, various formats, including group stages have been used. Reserve teams of the professional clubs, who compete in lower divisions of the league pyramid, were permitted to take part until 1990. For a number of years, only teams from the Primera División, Segunda A, about 23 teams from the Segunda B and the 17 Tercera División champions (or runners-up if the champion was a reserve team) were invited to enter, giving a total of 83. Amended rules for the 2019–20 edition led to the number of entrants increasing to 125, including winners of the regional divisions at the fifth level.

All rounds are single-leg ties with lower division teams hosting the match and the majority of the top-level clubs entering at the First Round (four teams taking part in the Supercopa de España entering in the Third round – last 32), other than the semi-final stage which is played over two legs. This is another change in the 2019–20 edition, with prior editions involving two legs from the point at which the top-tier clubs entered in the Fourth round (last 32). The final is a one-off game played at a neutral venue.

The winners qualify for both the Supercopa de España and the UEFA Europa League the following season; in the past, the runners-up often played in the Supercopa if the winners had also finished as league champions (although on some occasions in these circumstances, it was not played and the double winners were awarded the victory), and from the 2019–20 Supercopa de España edition onwards, the previous Copa del Rey runners-up automatically qualify in addition to the winners with four teams taking part in the event.

Throughout the history of the competition, there have been 12 actual trophies, which were  permanently awarded to clubs for winning the competition either three times in a row or on five separate occasions, and for other special reasons. Thus, five trophies have been permanently awarded to Barcelona, three to Athletic Bilbao and one to Real Madrid (the last Copa de la República in 1936). Athletic kept the first trophy as inaugural winners, Sevilla were awarded the Trofeo del Generalísimo after its first edition in 1939 and Atlético Madrid, winners the previous year, were awarded the 11th trophy following the death of Francisco Franco in 1976.

On 22 December 2010, at an extraordinary general meeting of the Royal Spanish Football Federation, Sevilla requested permission from the Federation to keep the trophy they had won in the 2010 final to commemorate the victory of the Spain national team at the 2010 FIFA World Cup in South Africa.

A new trophy was made by Madrid jeweler Federico Alegre. On 21 April 2011, Real Madrid became the first recipients of the trophy. During the post-game celebrations, the trophy was accidentally dropped by Real Madrid player Sergio Ramos from the top of a double-decker bus, which then ran over it. Ten pieces were found by civil servicemen when they recovered it from the ground at Plaza de Cibeles. The club received a copy which is displayed at Santiago Bernabéu.

Performances

‡ Counting the 1913 win by Racing de Irún, which merged with Irún Sporting Club in 1915 to form Real Unión. 
‡‡ Real Madrid's reserve team. Reserve teams have been banned from this competition from 1990–91 onward.
‡‡‡ The number of wins Athletic Bilbao have been credited with is disputed. The 1902 version was won by Bizcaya, a team made up of players from Athletic Bilbao and Bilbao FC. In 1903 these two clubs merged as the current Athletic Bilbao. The 1902 cup is on display in the Athletic museum and the club includes it in its own honors list.

Clubs in italic no longer exist. Seasons in bold indicate winners, whilst season in italic are losing finalists.

Top goalscorers

Bold indicates an active player.

Individual records 

 Most goals scored: 81 – 
 Most goals scored in finals: 9 – 
 Most finals scored in: 7 – 
 Most assists provided in finals: 6 – 
 Most man of the match awards won in finals: 3 – 
Most appearances made in finals: 10 –  and Sergio Busquets
 Most cup wins: 7 – José Maria Belauste, Piru Gaínza, Gerard Piqué, Sergio Busquets and

Broadcasters
From the 2019–20 season, the final match is already included in La Copa broadcasting rights package. Previously, the final match is excluded in selected countries (other broadcasters (including Spain) will receive the Supercopa rights after covering a Copa final match) due to laws and regulations of the tournament broadcasting rights by CNMC in Spain.

2022–2025

Spain

International

Notes

A.  En route to the final, Español de Madrid had tied one game and had not completed the other game, which led Athletic Bilbao to file a complaint. Faced with this problem and unable to quickly resolve the case, the Madrid Association decided to award the cup to Athletic as defending champions.

B.  Playing as Club Ciclista de San Sebastián.

C.  Playing as Vasconia de San Sebastián.

D.  A mini-group of three teams was played, with Athletic Bilbao defeating Madrid FC 2–0 a day before their win over Vasconia, thus the match between the Basque teams was decisive in deciding the winner, although not a typical final (Vasconia then played Madrid the following day to complete the group, also winning 2–0).

E.  The first final, played the day earlier, ended 2–2 after extra time.

F.  Originally played as a two-legged final. The first match, played seven days earlier, ended 2–2, and the second match, played six days earlier, ended 0–0.

G.  The first final, played two days earlier, ended 0–0 after extra time.

H.  The first and second final ended 1–1 after extra time. Both matches were played a month before the second replay.

I.  Real Madrid won the penalty shoot-out 4–3.

J.  Betis won the penalty shoot-out 8–7.

K.  Real Sociedad won the penalty shoot-out 4–2.

L.  Zaragoza won the penalty shoot-out 5–4.

M.  The match was suspended by heavy rain and hail in the 79th minute, and was resumed three days later.

N.  Barcelona won the penalty shoot-out 5–4.

References

External links

Official website at RFEF.es
Spain - List of Cup Finals at RSSSF.com

 
1
Spain
Recurring sporting events established in 1903
1903 establishments in Spain